Perkasie is a defunct train station formerly operated by SEPTA Regional Rail in Perkasie, Pennsylvania, USA. It closed on July 29, 1981, after SEPTA cancelled its diesel train routes.
 
The station was formerly operated by the Reading Company and later by Conrail and SEPTA. East Penn Railroad operates freight trains on the line between Lansdale, and beyond. However, active track ends just north of Quakertown.

The Perkasie Tunnel is located near the station.

The station was formerly equipped with a water tower, of which not a trace remains. 

Lehigh Valley Transit interurbans used a separate station at Walnut and Penn, several blocks to the south and east.

References

Railway stations closed in 1981
1981 disestablishments in Pennsylvania
Former Reading Company stations
Former SEPTA Regional Rail stations
Former railway stations in Bucks County, Pennsylvania